Buti is a South African masculine given name. Notable people with the name include:

Buti Khoza (born 1988), South African football goalkeeper
Buti Manamela (born 1979), South African public servant

African masculine given names